Moscow Narodny Bank Limited (MNB), London was created as an independent bank in October 1919 on the basis of the London branch or Mosnarbank (London) of the Moscow Narodny Bank, which had operated in London since 1915.

History
In 1919 due to disruption of relations with the parent company due to nationalization in Russia it was decided to protect the right of the London branch of the bank to exist and incorporate it as a British legal entity. The bank heads Jean Bubnov and Konstantin Popov submitted an application to register it as an English limited liability company, which was registered in London on October 18, 1919 as a company of England and Wales under number No.159752.

After Leonid Krasin organized Bolshevik supporters obtained BCEN-Eurobank in Paris as the first overseas Soviet bank, he, as head of the Centrosoyuz mission, which was formed on 24 February 1920 and was an attempt by the Bolshevik's Council of People's Commissars to break through the trade and political blockade of Bolshevist Russia by Western countries, travelled to London, met with British authorities beginning on 31 May 1920, and established a "Soviet House" or "Russia House" at 49 Moorgate in London, which was known as the All-Russian Cooperative Limited Liability Company "ARCOS" and supported Bolshevik control of the Moscow Narodny Bank (London), which had formed in October 1919, through Centrosoyuz as the next Soviet bank located overseas.

The declared authorized capital stock of MNB is £250,000. Original shareholding structure: Moscow Narodny Bank, Centrosoyuz, Central Association of Flax Growers, Selskosoyuz and Zakupsbyt.

The primary goal of the bank was financing of international trade of the Russian cooperative organizations with Britain and other countries. MNB became the first cooperative bank created as international trade-support facility.

In 1923, the bank set up a subsidiary Genossenschaftliche Transit Bank (Cooperative Transit Bank) in Riga, Latvia.

During 1924 the bank balance increased 2.5 fold and by the end of the year amounted to £2.4 million, and the bank’s capital stock increased to £500,000. In 1925 the capital stock doubled to £1 million. Such growth allowed MNB to open its branches in Paris in 1925 and in Berlin in 1928. In 1926, the bank agency was established in New York.

On 29 May 1923, Russia House or Soviet House also known as the All-Russian Cooperative Limited Liability Company "ARCOS" established its own Russian Trade Bank known as the ARCOS Bank which operated until the ARCOS affair during May 1927. In 1932 MNB took over the Russian Trade Bank established in London in 1923.

Resolution of the minutes of the meeting of the board of directors of MNB of March 1933: “the bank buys 1000 shares of the Dalbank Harbin bank for 50 thousand dollars in silver”. In 1933 the bank took over the Shanghai branch of Dalbank.

Paris branch of the bank was closed in 1934, branch in Berlin in 1935.

The bank worked during the World War II, with its staff gradually depleted. There were times when the number of people working there was down to four. Communications with many of the bank’s correspondents and clients were disrupted. As a result, the bank became little more than a payment agent for Gosbank. The balance sheet total during those years remained constant at £1 million.

By the end of 1948 the capital of the bank increased up to £15.5 million (1945 – £1.5 million).

In May 1950 the Shanghai branch of MNB was closed.

In 1952 the balance reduced to £6 million.

In 1956, after the Hungarian revolt, as the Soviet Union feared that its deposits in North American banks would be frozen as a retaliation, it decided to move some of its holdings to the Moscow Narodny Bank Limited. The British bank would then deposit that money in the U.S. banks. There would be no chance of confiscating that money, because it belonged to the British bank and not directly to the Soviets. 
On 28 February 1957, the sum of $800,000 was transferred. The Soviets also owned a bank in Paris, called the
Banque Commercial pour l'Europe du Nord. The Paris Russian bank took some Narodny's dollars and lent them. Initially dubbed "Eurobank dollars" after the bank's telex address, they eventually became known as eurodollars. as such deposits were at first held mostly by European banks and financial institutions.

In 1959, the former head of the Shanghai branch Andrey Dubonosov was appointed to a managerial position in the London branch of the bank and led Mosnarbank until 1967. During the period from 1958 till 1960 the number of staff members increased from 40 to almost 100.

According to Tomas Aligebov, Vneshtorgbank had correspondent accounts with Chase Manhattan Bank prior to 1959 but by 1964 to 1966 had become an international bank using currency swaps and transferred its dollars to correspondent accounts with the West German and Italian bank Airobank, Mosnarbank, Deutschebank, the Italian banks Banco Commerciale Italiano and Credita Italiana, BNL, and the Australian based English-Scotch-Australian Bank

From 1963 until 1972, Viktor Gerashchenko was at the MNB. He stated that the Central Bank of England was very strong and prevented MNB from obtaining loans from Moscow to supporting local companies associated with the local Communist Party or KGB, however, MNB and, to a lesser extent, the Paris-based Eurobank secured access to international and European markets to support various Socialist banks and the MNB conducted export and import settlements of the Soviet Union with Europe and loans to many small companies. He also said that both Gosbank and the department of planning and financial bodies of the Central Committee of the CPSU supervised MNB. He said that MNB owned residences for its employees at Highgate West Hill, not far from the Soviet trade mission at 32-33, Highgate West Hill, London N6 6NL, UK, which Leonid Krasin obtained after ending the trade embargo against Bolshevik Russia on 16 January 1920, and the grave of Karl Marx.

From 1960 till 1969 assets have grown from £55.6 million to £331.9 million, and the paid-in capital have grown fourfold during this period and amounted to £5 million. There are a number of reasons for the surge in MNB’s activity in the 1960s. For one thing, it reflected a general upturn in the Soviet Union’s
foreign economic relations: the volume of foreign trade in 1960, at over 10 billion rubles, was more than eight times higher than in 1946. Another factor was the re-organization in 1961 of the USSR Bank for Foreign Trade (Vneshtorgbank) — the second largest shareholder in MNB after Gosbank.

In 1963, MNB worked with Americans to obtain a very large grain purchase.

In 1963, the Beirut branch of the bank was opened. From 1969 to 1975, Tomas Alibegov was the deputy manager and then the branch manager Mosnarbank (Beirut) under Viktor Gerashchenko who was at this bank until 1971 when he was transferred to Moscow. According to Alibegov, the Beirut branch was second in size in Lebanon only to Arabbank and conducted loans among Czechoslovakia, Yugoslavia, East Germany, Libya, France, Lebanon, Egypt, North Yemen, Turkey, and Jordan. In 1973, the branch moved into a building next to the Bank of Lebanon and was sold to Saudi Arabia after the branch in Beirut closed and moved to Cyprus and became the Russian Commercial Bank RCB Bank.

In September 1964, The Guardian named Andrey Dubonosov the one of the most popular men in the City of London.

In 1965, the bank declared the possibility of exchanging transferable rubles for gold and freely convertible currencies.

On 7 November 1966, Dubonosov had a heart attack and in April 1967, Nikolai Vasilievich Nikitkin replaced Dubonosov as chairman of the board, but he was nominal and Dix, who ran operations, controlled the bank.

On 22 November 1971, the branch in Singapore opened. From the end of 1971 till the end of 1973 the bank’s assets have grown from £391.8 to £835.9 million.

In 1972, MNB worked with Americans to obtain a very large grain purchase.

In 1973 they began investing in the London Stock Exchange through City stockbroker Fiske & Co, today Fiske PLC.

In 1975, the Moscow representative office started its operations.

By 1977, the bank has been among 300 top banks in the world with assets of over $1 billion.

In 1980s, the bank placed a strong focus on foreign exchange dealings, and in particular on attracting funds from Western Europe's banks
to sustain its credit resources. The borrowings enabled it to support existing operations and provide the Vneshtorgbank with new loans as required.
In the early 1980s this work was severely disrupted by escalating political and economic tensions. The anti-Soviet campaign that unfolded in the USA,
Britain and other Western countries, combined with difficulties experienced by some socialist countries in keeping up their external payments, led to a situation whereby many Western banks refused to enter into credit, deposit and in some cases even foreign exchange arrangements with Soviet banks, including Moscow Narodny. Faced with these circumstances, MNB London practically stopped granting any new credits for operations not connected with Soviet foreign trade, and gradually reduced the bank’s loan portfolio as existing loans were repaid. No new medium-term loans were granted, either, with activities limited to short-term trade finance operations. Over the period from 1 July 1981 to 1 May 1982, the amount of credits with terms of 1 year or above on MNB’s balance sheet shrank from 794.4 million to 713.2 million rubles. At the same time, work on maintaining the bank’s supply of credit resources was stepped up.

In 1985 it was decided to close the Beirut branch.

In August 1986, after the redemption of imperial bonds issued before 1917, MNB played a key role in provision of an opportunity for the Soviet Union to get direct international loans again.

MNB had long worked with Morgan Grenfell & Company.

In 1991 the Central Bank of Russia became the owner of the control stock of MNB.

Support on the part of MNB allowed Helen Sharman to become the first British cosmonaut in May 1991.

In 1995 MNB opened its representative office in Canada.

In 1997 MNB created a subsidiary CB Mosnarbank CJSC in Moscow, which later on merged with OJSC JCSB Evrofinance and formed Evrofinance Mosnarbank.

In 1999 a new representative office was opened in Beijing.

In December 2005 VTB acquires Moscow Narodny Bank Limited.

Directors and General Managers 

 Jean (Ivan) V. Bubnov (10.1919–06.1920)
 F. I. Shmelyov (06.1920–10.1924)
 Nikolai V. Gavrilov (10.1924–09.1925)
 F. I. Shmelyov (09.1925–08.1927)
 M. V. Zemblyukhter (08.1927–12.1931)
 Alexander I. Shvetsov (12.1931–12.1932)
 Emanuel Kviring (12.1932–09.1934)
 Michael Wuhl (09.1934–1937)
 Ivan M. Andreyev (03.1940–05.1947)
 A. A. Oleinik (05.1947–06.1950)
 Alexei A. Kuznetsov (06.1950–05.1953)
 Alexei A. Chernozub (05.1953–05.1959)
 Andrey I. Dubonosov (05.1959–04.1967)
 Nikolai V. Nikitkin (04.1967–09.1972)
 Sergei A. Shevchenko (09.1972–12.1976)
 Oleg N. Kulikov (12.1976–12.1982)
 Dmitry Ya. Penzin (12.1982–03.1987)
 Alexander S. Maslov (03.1987–07.1991)
 Alexander P. Semikoz (08.1991–07.1997)
 Yury V. Poletayev (01.1997–07.1997)
 Igor G. Suvorov (07.1997–12.2005)
 Yury V. Ponomaryov (03.1998–09.1999)

MNB Family tree

Notes

References

Banks of the Soviet Union
Soviet Union–United Kingdom relations
Banks based in the City of London